State Route 650 (SR 650) is a north–south state highway in the southern portion of Ohio. Its southern terminus is at U.S. Route 52 in Hanging Rock. From this point, the route heads northward to the community of Pine Grove in Wayne National Forest.

History
State Route 650 made its first appearance in 1955 along the routing that it currently occupies between U.S. Route 52 and State Route 522.  The highway has not seen any significant changes to its routing since its designation.

Major intersections

References

650
Transportation in Lawrence County, Ohio